Deepshikha Nagpal simply known as Deepshikha, is an Indian actress and film director. She received acclaim in the Hindi film industry only after the release of Koyla. She was also seen in the Bollywood movie Dhoom Dhadaka with Satish Kaushik. She has also acted in Tamil films and a number of TV soaps. Her debut film as a director, Yeh Dooriyan, was released in August 2011. She was a contestant on Bigg Boss 8 in 2014.

Personal life
Deepshika married Jeet Upendra and has two children, but after ten years they divorced. She has an older sister who is a TV Actress Aarti Nagpal. In January 2012, she married Indore-based Keshav Arora, who had been her co-actor in her directorial debut Yeh Dooriyan.

She appeared on Season 8 of the Colors reality show Big Boss, and was evicted on the 21st day.

Filmography

 1994: Gangster
 1994: Betaaj Badshah as Girl saved by Arjun
 1995: Rani Hindustani as Ganga / Mohini
 1995: Karan Arjun
 1995: Dance Party Poison
 1997: Police Station
 1997: Koyla as Bindya
 1998: Barsaat Ki Raat
 1999: Teri Mohabbat Ke Naam as Manju
 1999: Monisha En Monalisa
 1999: Kahani Kismat Ki (1999 film)
 1999: Jaanam Samjha Karo as Girl in Temple
 1999: Baadshah as Rani
 1999: Dillagi
 2000: Dard Pardesaan De as Kamal / Dolly
 2000: Agniputra
 2002: Rishtey as The Seductress
 2004: Dukaan: Pila House as Shyama (bride)
 2005: Pyaar Mein Twist as Parul Arya
 2006: Maut ka Saudagar as Lavanya Dinega
 2006: Corporate
 2006: Mohtyachi Renuka (Marathi film) as Preeti
 2007: Red Swastik as Sarika
 2007: Partner as Pammi
 2008: Mate Ani Dela Lakhye Faguna as Shikha
 2008: Bhram: An Illusion as Sunita Sharma
 2008: Pranali: The Tradition as Chanda
 2009: Tukya Tukwila Nagya Nachwila
 2008: Dhoom Dadaka as Rambha J. English
 2011: Gandhi to Hitler
 2011: Yeh Dooriyan as Simi (also credited as producer, director, writer, dialogue and screenplay)
 2015: Second Hand Husband as Kaajal
 2017: Raktdhar
 2018: Teri Bhabhi Hai Pagle Director: Vinod Tiwari
 2019: One Day: Justice Delivered as Dr. Reena Chopra

Television

References

External links
 

Living people
Indian television actresses
Indian women film directors
Indian film actresses
21st-century Indian actresses
21st-century Indian film directors
Actresses in Hindi cinema
Actresses in Hindi television
Indian women film producers
Indian women screenwriters
Hindi screenwriters
Hindi film producers
Hindi-language film directors
Actresses from Madhya Pradesh
Film directors from Madhya Pradesh
Film producers from Madhya Pradesh
Screenwriters from Madhya Pradesh
Businesswomen from Madhya Pradesh
Bigg Boss (Hindi TV series) contestants
Year of birth missing (living people)